Osazones are a class of carbohydrate derivatives found in organic chemistry formed when reducing sugars are reacted with excess of phenylhydrazine at boiling temperatures.

Formation 
Osazone formation was developed by  Emil Fischer, who used the reaction as a test to identify monosaccharides.

The formation of a pair of hydrazone functionalities involves both oxidation and condensation reactions. Since the reaction requires a free carbonyl group, only "reducing sugars" participate. Sucrose, which is nonreducing, does not form an osazone.

Appearance 
Osazones are highly coloured and crystalline compounds. Osazones are readily distinguished.
Maltosazone (from maltose) forms petal-shaped crystals.
Lactosazone (from lactose) forms powder puff-shaped crystals.
Galactosazone (from galactose) forms rhombic-plate shaped crystals.
Glucosazone (from glucose, fructose or mannose) forms broomstick or needle-shaped crystals.

Historic references

References

Carbohydrates
Hydrazones
Emil Fischer